The 2020 Honolulu mayoral election determined the Mayor of the City and County of Honolulu for the term commencing in January 2021. Incumbent mayor Kirk Caldwell is ineligible to run for a third term due to term limits.

The position of Mayor of Honolulu is non-partisan. A nonpartisan blanket primary was held on Saturday, August 8, 2020. With no candidate receiving an outright majority of the vote in the primary, the top two finishers, Rick Blangiardi and Keith Amemiya, advanced to a November general election runoff on Tuesday, November 3, 2020.

Rick Blangiardi dominated the general election, defeating Amemiya with 58.2% of all votes. The City and County also had a record-shattering turnout, with 385,442 total votes in the election being cast. This was the highest turnout in as many years. Blangiardi was inaugurated as mayor on January 2, 2021.

Candidates

Advanced to runoff
 Keith Amemiya, insurance executive and former executive director of Hawaii High School Athletic Association
 Rick Blangiardi, former University of Hawaii football coach, businessman, and television executive for Hawaii News Now

Eliminated during primary
 John Carroll, former state senator, nominee for U.S. Senate in 2000 and 2016, and candidate for Governor of Hawaii in 2018
Colleen Hanabusa, former U.S. representative for Hawaii's 1st congressional district (2011–2015; 2016–2019) (Endorsed Blangiardi)
 Mufi Hannemann, former mayor of Honolulu, 2005–2010
 Choon James, real estate broker, candidate for Honolulu City Council, district 2 in 2018
 Audrey Keesing, convenor/Hawaii State President of the National Organization for Women, 1994–1999, participant U.N. 4th World Conference on Women. 1995 candidate for State House of Representatives, 1996, participant in The Native Hawaiian Federal Recognition: Joint Hearing
 Kymberly Pine, Honolulu City councilmember, district 1
 William "Bud" Stonebraker, pastor of South Shore Christian Fellowship, Kalo farmer, former Hawaiʻi state representative (2000–2006)
 Ho Yin (Jason) Wong, former Chief Governance & Information Officer of an IaaS cloud computing technology company.

Withdrew
 Ikaika Anderson, Honolulu City councilmember, district 3; council chair and presiding officer
Marissa Kerns, 2018 Republican nominee for lieutenant governor of Hawaii
 Ron Menor, Honolulu City councilmember, district 9

Declined
 Charles Djou, former U.S. representative for Hawaii's 1st congressional district (2010–2011); candidate for Mayor of Honolulu in 2016

Endorsements

Primary

Polling

Results

General election

Polling

Results

See also
 2020 Hawaii elections

Notes

References

External links
Official campaign websites for mayoral candidates
 Keith Amemiya for Mayor
 Rick Blangiardi for Mayor

2020 Hawaii elections
Mayoral elections in Honolulu
2020 United States mayoral elections